Alejandro "Álex" de Frutos Gomez (born 29 September 1992) is a Spanish field hockey player who plays as a midfielder for Club de Campo and the Spanish national team.

International career
De Frutos made his debut for the senior national team in November 2014 in a test match against Great Britain. He represented Spain at the 2018 World Cup. At the 2019 EuroHockey Championship, he won his first medal with the senior team as they finished second.

References

External links

1992 births
Living people
Field hockey players from Madrid
Spanish male field hockey players
Male field hockey midfielders
2018 Men's Hockey World Cup players
Club de Campo Villa de Madrid players
División de Honor de Hockey Hierba players